The Battle of Wami was fought during the East African Campaign of World War I, near the Wami River in present-day Tanzania.

References

Battles of the East African Campaign
Battles of World War I involving Germany